Elizabeth "Lisa" McGee (born August 1980) is an Irish playwright and screenwriter. McGee is the creator and writer of Derry Girls, a comedy series that began airing on Channel 4 in the UK in January 2018. In 2018, she was listed as one of BBC's 100 Women.

Career
She was writer on attachment with the Royal National Theatre in London in 2006. Her plays include Jump, The Heights, Nineteen Ninety Two, and Girls and Dolls, for which she won the Stewart Parker Trust New Playwright Bursary 2007.

McGee's television credits include The Things I Haven't Told You for BBC Three, the Irish television series Raw which she created for RTÉ, time as a writer for three series of the BAFTA-nominated Being Human for the BBC, the Channel 4 sitcom London Irish, which she created, writing for the Golden Globe-nominated drama series The White Queen for BBC 1, Indian Summers for Channel 4, and The Deceived for Channel 5 co-written with her husband Tobias Beer. Her stage play Jump has been adapted into a film.

Personal life
McGee was born in Derry, Northern Ireland to an Irish Catholic parents, Chris and Anne McGee. She studied at Thornhill College and then studied Drama at Queen's University Belfast. 

She is married to actor Tobias Beer.

In December 2022 she received the Freedom of the City of Derry.

References

External links
 

1980 births
Living people
Writers from Derry (city)
People educated at Thornhill College
Women screenwriters from Northern Ireland
Television writers from Northern Ireland
Alumni of Queen's University Belfast
Irish women screenwriters
BBC 100 Women
British women television writers
21st-century dramatists and playwrights from Northern Ireland
21st-century women writers from Northern Ireland
Women dramatists and playwrights from Northern Ireland
21st-century British screenwriters